State Route 11 (SR 11) is a state highway in the U.S. state of Maine. It is a major interregional route which runs nearly the entire length of the state from south to north. The southern terminus of SR 11 is at the New Hampshire state line in Lebanon, where it connects to New Hampshire Route 11. The northern terminus is at U.S. Route 1 (US 1) and SR 161 in Fort Kent, near the Canada–US border. The highway travels through York, Cumberland, Androscoggin, Kennebec, Somerset, Waldo, Penobscot, Piscataquis and Aroostook counties. At  in length, SR 11 is the longest state highway in Maine by a wide margin.

History

1925: New England Interstate Route 11

The number 11 dates back to 1922 when the New England road marking system was adopted, although Maine did not take part until 1925. New England Route 11 was known as the Manchester-Biddeford Route, as it began in Manchester, Vermont and ended in Biddeford, Maine. It followed the current routing of US 202/SR 11 between Lebanon and downtown Sanford, continued northeast into Alfred along modern US 202, then through Lyman and Arundel along modern SR 111 to terminate at Route 1 (the modern intersection of US 1 and SR 111) in Biddeford.

1926: State Route designation 
In 1926, the U.S. Numbered Highway System was established and superseded the New England Interstate system. Some of the New England Interstate routes were integrated into the new system (such as Route 1, which became part of US 1). Route 11 did not become a U.S. Highway but was one of several that were redesignated as state highways and kept their existing numbers. State Route 11 was officially designated in 1926 and kept its existing routing until 1933.

1933-34: Renumbering and extension

Interregional route experiment 
In 1931, the Maine State Highway Commission conducted an experiment in which it designated a new low-numbered state highway (SR 4) which ran mostly on existing alignments of the original 1925 intrastate routes (which were all numbered 100 and higher to avoid conflicts with the New England Interstate routes) and replaced several of the original numbers along those alignments. This effectively created a long interregional route that covered an important travel corridor between the New Hampshire and Canadian borders, all with a single route number.

This experiment proved to be a success, and the SHC decided to expand the interregional route system across the entire state highway system using low route numbers, including those from the original New England routes. Three-digit route numbers (and larger two-digit numbers) would be used to fill in shorter alignments to complement the interregional routes. This process began in 1933 and was finished in 1934. Many of the existing 1925 routes were truncated, overlapped with the new routes, or eliminated altogether. Routes which were completely eliminated generally had their numbers reassigned somewhere else in the system.

Changes to SR 11 
The original routing of SR 11 from the New Hampshire state line to downtown Sanford was maintained (and was overlapped by the newly designated US 202 in 1936). The SR 11 designation was dropped from the section between Sanford and Alfred, as it had already been made part of the new SR 4 in 1931 (and is now US 202/SR 4A) and the remaining segment east of Alfred was given the new SR 111 designation.

From downtown Sanford, SR 11 was cosigned with SR 109 into Shapleigh, completely replaced former SR 203 between Shapleigh and West Newfield, and replaced most of SR 110 from Newfield to Limington, where SR 11 crosses SR 25 today. New routing was used between Limington and Standish, then SR 11 was cosigned with SR 113 in Standish and Baldwin as it continues to be today. SR 11 used another section of new routing to reach Sebago, then was cosigned along the northern part of SR 114 to that route's terminus in Naples. SR 11 replaced former SR 116 between Sebago and Mechanic Falls (part of which is now overlapped by US 302 and SR 35), then was cosigned with SR 121 to that route's terminus in Auburn.

Between Auburn and Augusta, SR 11 was cosigned with SR 100 (which had just recently been extended as it too was intended to be a major interregional state highway). North of Augusta, SR 11 was routed onto an old alignment of SR 100 to Waterville (which is now part of SR 104). The highway then used new routing between Waterville and Corinth, part of which was shared with the newly designated SR 43. SR 11 was then cosigned with the newly designated SR 15 to Charleston, then split off on new routing as far as Lagrange, where it met up with SR 100 (modern SR 155).

SR 11 was cosigned with SR 100 (modern SR 155) between Lagrange and Howland, then with US 2 between Howland and Mattawamkeag, and finally with SR 157 between Mattawamkeag and Medway. SR 11 replaced former State Route 211 which ran between Medway and Sherman (near where exit 264 on I-95 is now located), and finally replaced nearly the entire length of SR 158 from Sherman to Fort Kent, terminating at US 1 and SR 161 as it does today.

Junction list

Alternate routes

State Route 11A
There are two separate highways in Maine designated SR 11A.

Southern segment 
Locally it is known as Oak Street. The route was designated in 1931 as a bypass of the downtown area. Its southern terminus is at US 202 and SR 11 west of downtown and its northern terminus is at the intersection with Main Street (SR 11/SR 109) and Bridge Street (SR 224) north of downtown.

Junction list

Northern segment 

SR 11A is  loop of SR 11 located in Penobscot County. It is a former alignment of both SR 11 and SR 15. SR 11A directly serves the town of Charleston, which modern SR 11 bypasses to the south. The southern terminus is at SR 11 in Charleston and the northern terminus is at SR 11 in the neighboring town of Bradford. The road is known locally as Main Road and Upper Charleston Road.

The route currently occupied by SR 11A was originally designated as part of SR 15 in 1926. When SR 11 was extended in 1933-1934, it was cosigned with SR 15 along this stretch of road, intersecting with SR 221 north of downtown Bradford. SR 221 was truncated from its former terminus in Brownville to this junction. In 1960, SR 15 was moved onto a more heavily utilized western bypass of Charleston, splitting from SR 11 further south of town and leaving the section through downtown Charleston signed solely as SR 11. Between 1984 and 1985, SR 11 was moved onto a new alignment which bypassed Charleston to the south, traveled due east into downtown Bradford where it intersected with SR 155 and SR 221, and was cosigned with SR 221 north to rejoin with the existing alignment north of town.  At that time, the orphaned route through downtown Charleston was designated as SR 11A.

SR 221 no longer connects directly to SR 11A as it was further truncated to its junction with SR 11 and SR 155 in downtown Bradford between 2007 and 2011.

Junction list

State Route 11B

SR 11B is a  business route of SR 11 in Millinocket. Most of the route travels from north to south along one-way Penobscot Avenue through the central business district of the town. It begins at the intersection of Central Street (SR 11/SR 157) and Penobscot Avenue, travels south to Poplar Street, then turns west along Poplar Street and becomes a two-way street for one block before ending at Katahdin Avenue (SR 11).

Signage is only posted in the westbound or southbound direction on SR 11/SR 157, and on SR 11B itself. SR 11B is not signed with directional banners as it is only designed to be driven in one direction.  No signage is posted along SR 11 at Poplar Street or Katahdin Avenue at SR 11B's southern end; northbound traffic is directed to continue on SR 11 into downtown. Signage for the route appears to have been installed between 2007 and 2014.

Junction list 
Mileage in the state route log increases from north to south, as the route can only be driven in that direction.

See also
Route 11 (New England)

References

External links

011
Transportation in Androscoggin County, Maine
Transportation in Aroostook County, Maine
Transportation in Cumberland County, Maine
Transportation in Kennebec County, Maine
Transportation in Penobscot County, Maine
Transportation in Piscataquis County, Maine
Transportation in Somerset County, Maine
Transportation in Waldo County, Maine
Transportation in York County, Maine
North Maine Woods